The 23rd Producers Guild of America Awards (also known as 2012 Producers Guild Awards), honoring the best film and television producers of 2011, were held at The Beverly Hilton Hotel in Beverly Hills, California on January 21, 2012. The documentary nominations were announced on December 2, 2011, the television nominations on December 7, 2011, and the motion picture nominations on January 3, 2012.

Winners and nominees

Film
{| class=wikitable style="width="100%"
|-
! colspan="2" style="background:#abcdef;"| Darryl F. Zanuck Award for Outstanding Producer of Theatrical Motion Pictures
|-
| colspan="2" style="vertical-align:top;"|
 The Artist – Thomas Langmann Bridesmaids – Judd Apatow, Barry Mendel, and Clayton Townsend
 The Descendants – Jim Burke, Alexander Payne, and Jim Taylor
 The Girl with the Dragon Tattoo – Ceán Chaffin and Scott Rudin
 The Help – Michael Barnathan, Chris Columbus, and Brunson Green
 Hugo – Graham King and Martin Scorsese
 The Ides of March – George Clooney, Grant Heslov, and Brian Oliver
 Midnight in Paris – Letty Aronson and Stephen Tenenbaum
 Moneyball – Michael De Luca, Rachael Horovitz, and Brad Pitt
 War Horse – Kathleen Kennedy and Steven Spielberg
|-
! colspan="2" style="background:#abcdef;"| Outstanding Producer of Animated Theatrical Motion Pictures
|-
| colspan="2" style="vertical-align:top;"|
 The Adventures of Tintin – Steven Spielberg, Peter Jackson, and Kathleen Kennedy Cars 2 – Denise Ream
 Kung Fu Panda 2 – Melissa Cobb
 Puss in Boots  – Latifa Ouaou and Joe M. Aguilar
 Rango – Gore Verbinski and John B. Carls
|-
! colspan="2" style="background:#abcdef;"| Outstanding Producer of Documentary Theatrical Motion Pictures
|-
| colspan="2" style="vertical-align:top;"|
 Beats, Rhymes & Life: The Travels of A Tribe Called Quest – Michael Rapaport, Edward Parks, Frank Mele, and Debra Koffler Bill Cunningham New York – Philip Gefter
 Project Nim – Simon Chinn
 Senna – James Gay-Rees
 The Union – Cameron Crowe and Michelle Panek
|}

Television

Digital

David O. Selznick Achievement Award in Theatrical Motion PicturesSteven SpielbergMilestone AwardLes MoonvesNorman Lear Achievement Award in TelevisionDon MischerStanley Kramer AwardIn the Land of Blood and Honey

Visionary Award
Stan Lee

References

 2010
2011 film awards
2011 guild awards
2011 television awards